Olamogru  is a village in the southern state of Karnataka, India. It is located in the Puttur taluk of Dakshina Kannada district.

Demographics
 India census, Olamogru had a population of 5089 with 2547 males and 2542 females.

See also
 Dakshina Kannada
 Districts of Karnataka

References

External links
 http://dk.nic.in/

Villages in Dakshina Kannada district